Wang Xiao may refer to:

Wang Xiao (politician) (王晓), party chief of Xining
Wang Xiao (footballer, born 1979) (王霄)
Wang Xiao (footballer, born 1992) (王啸)
Wang Xiao (actress) (王晓)